Monet painted 37 works of Venice which he began during his stay in the city in 1908. These include a series of canvases of the Grand Canal. He had the habit of studying the same subject in a varying light, at different times of the day, which resulted during his career in many distinct series, like for example the Water Lilies series, Poplar series, Rouen Cathedral series, Haystacks series and Charing Cross Bridge series. 

During his stay in Venice, Monet's accommodation was on the Grand Canal, firstly in the Palazzo Barbaro and secondly in a hotel nearby. He painted six views of this stretch of the waterway, near the church of Santa Maria della Salute. He also painted individual buildings on the Grand Canal such as the Palazzo Dario.

List of the paintings
 All works listed are described as  Painting - oil on canvas .
 The Catalog Nos are as defined by Daniel Wildenstein in the Monet: Catalogue Raisonné. 

Public display

In 2018, the National Gallery in London exhibited nine of the Venice paintings, including two paintings of the series, together in a single room, for the duration of a temporary exhibition titled Monet & Architecture, devoted to Claude Monet's use of architecture as a means to structure and enliven his art. This was a rare occurrence because no museum owns or exhibits more than two in a permanent collection.

The two paintings of the series exhibited were the examples from the following collections:

 Fine Arts Museums of San Francisco
 Nahmad Collection, Monaco

See also
 Le Grand Canal San Giorgio Maggiore'', Monet series

References

Paintings of Venice by Claude Monet
Series of paintings by Claude Monet
Churches in art
Water in art
Paintings of Venice